General Stanley may refer to:

Clifford L. Stanley (born 1947), U.S. Marine Corps major general
David S. Stanley (1828–1902), Union Army major general

See also
Arthur Stanley-Clarke (1886–1983), British Army brigadier general
Henry Calvert Stanley-Clarke (1872–1943), British Army brigadier general
Attorney General Stanley (disambiguation)